Melodifestivalen 2023 was the 63rd edition of the Swedish music competition Melodifestivalen, which was organised by Sveriges Television (SVT) and took place over a six-week period between 4 February and 11 March 2023. The winner of the competition was Loreen with the song "Tattoo", who will represent  in the Eurovision Song Contest 2023. All shows were hosted by Farah Abadi and Jesper Rönndahl.

Format 

After the cancellation of the traditional tour around six cities of the country (namely Malmö, Gothenburg, Linköping, Lidköping, Örnsköldsvik and Stockholm) for the previous edition due to the COVID-19 Omicron variant, SVT subsequently announced that the six cities would host the tour in 2023 instead, with new dates. As usual, a total of 28 entries took part in the competition, 12 of which progressed to the final. Farah Abadi and Jesper Rönndahl were revealed as the presenters of Melodifestivalen 2023 on 24 September 2022.

Proceeds from the voting were, like in the last three shows of the previous edition, donated to aid relief efforts during the 2022 Russian invasion of Ukraine. Starting from the second heat, proceeds were also donated to aid relief efforts in the aftermath of the 2023 Turkey–Syria earthquake.

Semi-final format changes 

Changes to the format of the semi-final show were announced on 23 November 2022. As opposed to the third- and fourth-placed songs from each of the previous four heats (eight songs in total) being allotted into two separate semi-finals in the previous edition, all of those songs now compete against each other in a single semi-final, with the top four songs advancing to the final, similar to the preceding heats. Viewers are presented with the preliminary top four songs (in a random order) midway through the voting window, and are then provided with new votes in order to continue influencing the result. After the window is closed, the full breakdown of the results, including points given out by each age group, is shown on screen.

Competing entries 
On 26 August 2022, SVT opened a public submission window (with the deadline on 16 September 2022) to select one half of the contestants, the other half being made up of artists specially invited by the broadcaster. Upon closing the submission period, SVT announced that over 2,800 applications had been received, to be reviewed by a professional jury chaired by producer Karin Gunnarsson.

The first half of contestants were officially announced by SVT on 29 November 2022, while the second half was revealed on the following 30 November. Several participants had previously competed at Melodifestivalen: Axel Schylström (2017), Eva Rydberg & Ewa Roos (2021), Jon Henrik Fjällgren (2015, 2017, and 2019), Loreen (2011, 2017, and winner in 2012), Loulou Lamotte (2021, and winner in 2020, both as part of The Mamas), Mariette (2015, 2017, 2018, and 2020), duo Nordman (2005 and 2008), band Panetoz (2014 and 2016), Paul Rey (2020 and 2021), Theoz (2022), Tone Sekelius (2022), Victor Crone (2015 and 2020) and Wiktoria (2016, 2017, and 2019).

Heats

Heat 1 
The first heat took place on 4 February 2023 in Scandinavium, Gothenburg. 2,912,000 viewers watched the heat live. A total of 9,852,321 votes were cast, using 525,532 devices.

Heat 2 
The second heat took place on 11 February 2023 in Saab Arena, Linköping. 2,830,000 viewers watched the heat live. A total of 10,108,443 votes were cast, using 527,368 devices.

Heat 3 
The third heat took place on 18 February 2023 in Sparbanken Lidköping Arena, Lidköping. 2,598,000 viewers watched the heat live. A total of 9,522,729 votes were cast, using 512,158 devices.

Heat 4 
The fourth heat took place on 25 February 2023 in Malmö Arena, Malmö. 2,814,000 viewers watched the heat live. A total of 9,932,645 votes were cast, using 542,205 devices. During Loreen's performance, an environmental activist invaded the stage.

Semi-final 
The semi-final took place on 4 March 2023 in Hägglunds Arena, Örnsköldsvik. 2,315,000 viewers watched the semi-final live. A total of 12,078,625 votes were cast (which is a record for a Second Chance round), using 541,460 devices.

Final 
The final took place on 11 March 2023 in Friends Arena, Stockholm, where Loreen won with her song "Tattoo". 3,419,000 viewers watched the final live. A record-breaking total of 23,521,188 votes were cast, using 936,964 devices.

Ratings

Gallery

Heat 1

Heat 2

Heat 3

Heat 4

Notes

References

External links 
 Melodifestivalen Official Site

2023 song contests
Eurovision Song Contest 2023
2023
February 2023 events in Sweden
March 2023 events in Sweden
2020s in Gothenburg
2020s in Malmö